A collaborative development environment (CDE) is an online meeting space where a software development project's stakeholders can work together, no matter what time zone or region they are in, to discuss, document, and produce project deliverables. The term was coined in 2002 by Grady Booch and Alan W. Brown.

It is seen as an evolution from the integrated development environment (IDE), which combined programming tools on the desktop, and the extended development environment (XDE), which combined lifecycle development tools with an IDE (such as Microsoft Azure DevOps and the IBM Rational Rose XDE); while the IDE focuses on tools to support the individual developer, the CDE focuses on supporting the needs of the development team as a whole. 

Although growing from a tool base in the software development sector, the CDE has been taken up in other sectors, with teams typically geographically dispersed, where it is beneficial to be able to collaborate across the web, including automotive and aeronautical engineering, movie production, and civil engineering.

Typical Functionalities
 Version control system
 Bug tracking system
 Todo list
 Mailing list
 Document management system
 Forum

See also
Application lifecycle management (ALM)
Forge (software)
Online integrated development environment (Online IDE or Web IDE)
Project management software
Systems development life cycle
Software project management
Computer-supported collaboration

References

Integrated development environments